Shelley Hymel is a developmental/educational psychologist and professor at the University of British Columbia (UBC) in Vancouver, British Columbia, Canada. Her research focuses on issues related to school bullying, children's peer relationships, and social-emotional learning.

Biography 
Hymel earned her Ph.D. in educational psychology from the University of Illinois in 1982. She was a faculty member at the University of Waterloo before joining the Department of Education at UBC in 1993.

Hymel is the co-founder, along with Susan Swearer, of the Bullying Research Network, a group that links more 200 researchers from more than 17 countries in the field of bullying and peer victimization.

Awards 

 2015: UBC Killam Research Prize
 2015: University of Illinois Education Alumni Association (EAA) Distinguished Alumni Award

Selected works 

 Hymel, S., & Swearer, S.M. (2015). Four decades of research on school bullying: An introduction. American Psychologist, 70 (4), 300–310.
 Swearer, S.M., & Hymel, S. (2015). Understanding the bullying dynamic: Moving toward a social-ecological diathesis-stress model. American Psychologist, 70 (4),344-353.
 Hymel, S. & Bonanno, R. (2014). Moral disengagement processes in bullying. Theory into Practice. 53, 278–285.
 Hymel, S., Rocke-Henderson, N. & Bonanno, R.A. (2005). Moral disengagement: A framework for understanding bullying among adolescents. Journal of Social Sciences, 8, 1-11.
 Vaillancourt, T., Hymel, S., & McDougall, P. (2003). Bullying is power: Implications for school-based intervention strategies. Special issue: Journal of Applied School Psychology, 19, 157–175.

References

Year of birth missing (living people)
Living people
Canadian psychologists
University of British Columbia
University of Illinois alumni
Developmental psychologists
Canadian women psychologists
Educational psychologists